Surana is a small village having around a population of 700, situated 6 km from Narnaul, Haryana, India.

Villages in Mahendragarh district